Morse v. Frederick, 551 U.S. 393 (2007), is a United States Supreme Court case where the Court held, 5–4, that the First Amendment does not prevent educators from suppressing student speech that is reasonably viewed as promoting illegal drug use at or across the street from a school-supervised event.
In 2002, Juneau-Douglas High School principal Deborah Morse suspended student Joseph Frederick after he displayed a banner reading "BONG  4 JESUS" across the street from the school during the 2002 Winter Olympics torch relay. Frederick sued, claiming his constitutional rights to free speech were violated. His suit was dismissed by the federal district court, but on appeal, the Ninth Circuit reversed the ruling, concluding that Frederick's speech rights were violated.  The case then went on to the Supreme Court. 

Chief Justice John Roberts, writing for the majority, concluded that the school officials did not violate the First Amendment. To do so, he made three legal determinations: first, that "school speech" doctrine should apply because Frederick's speech occurred "at a school event"; second, that the speech was "reasonably viewed as promoting illegal drug use"; and third, that a principal may legally restrict that speech—based on the three existing First Amendment school speech precedents, other constitutional jurisprudence relating to schools and a school's "important, indeed, perhaps compelling interest" in deterring drug use by students.

One scholar noted that "by its plain language, Morses holding is narrow in that it expressly applies only to student speech promoting illegal drug use." She adds, however, that courts could nonetheless apply it to other student speech that, like speech encouraging illegal drug use, similarly undermines schools' educational missions or threatens students' safety. "Further, Morse arguably permits viewpoint discrimination of purely political speech whenever that speech mentions illegal drugs—a result seemingly at odds with the First Amendment."

Background and procedural history

On January 24, 2002, students and staff at Juneau-Douglas High School in Alaska were permitted to leave classes to watch the Olympic Torch pass by as part of the 2002 Winter Olympics torch relay. Joseph Frederick, who was late for school that day, joined some friends on the sidewalk across from the high school, off school grounds. Frederick and his friends waited for the television cameras so they could unfurl a banner reading "BONG  4 JESUS". Frederick was quoted as saying he had first seen the phrase on a snowboard sticker. When they displayed the banner, then-principal Deborah Morse ran across the street and seized it.

Morse initially suspended Frederick for five days for violating the school district's anti-drug policy, but increased the suspension to ten days after Frederick quoted Thomas Jefferson. Frederick administratively appealed his suspension to the superintendent who denied his appeal but limited it to the time Frederick had already spent out of school prior to his appeal to the superintendent (eight days). Frederick then appealed to the Juneau School Board, which upheld the suspension on March 19, 2002.

District court

On April 25, 2002, Frederick filed a civil rights lawsuit (under 42 U.S.C. § 1983) against Morse and the school board, claiming they violated his federal and state constitutional rights to free speech. He sought a declaratory relief (for a declaratory judgment that his First Amendment rights had been violated), injunctive relief (for an injunction to remove the reference to the ten-day suspension from his school records), and monetary awards (compensatory damages, punitive damages, and attorney's fees).

The United States District Court for the District of Alaska dismissed Frederick's case on summary judgment. The district court reasoned that Bethel School District No. 403 v. Fraser, as opposed to Tinker v. Des Moines Independent Community School District, governed Frederick's school speech. Under this premise, the Court ruled that, given the stipulated facts, Morse and the school board had not infringed Frederick's First Amendment rights, because Morse had reasonably interpreted the banner as contravening the school's policies on drug abuse prevention.

Ninth Circuit
The Ninth Circuit reversed the decision of the District Court. The unanimous panel decision was written by Judge Andrew Kleinfeld.

First, the Court decided that the incident should be interpreted under school-speech doctrines, even though Frederick was standing across the street, and not on school grounds.

Thus, for Judge Kleinfeld, "the question comes down to whether a school may, in the absence of concern about disruption of educational activities, punish and censor non-disruptive, off-campus speech by students during school-authorized activities because the speech promotes a social message contrary to the one favored by the school. The answer under controlling, long-existing precedent is plainly 'No.'" To reach this determination, the Court inquired whether Frederick's constitutional rights were violated.. The Court, in holding (contra the District Court) that Tinker v. Des Moines Independent Community School District provided the controlling analysis, distinguished Bethel School District No. 403 v. Fraser and Hazelwood School District v. Kuhlmeier.

Public response
Juneau school district superintendent Peggy Cowan stated, "My concern is that [the court's ruling] could compromise our ability to send a consistent message against the use of illegal drugs."

Certiorari and oral arguments
The school board petitioned the Supreme Court to review the Ninth Circuit's decision. On December 1, 2006, the Court accepted the case.

Oral arguments were heard on the morning of March 19, 2007. Kenneth Starr first spoke on behalf of the petitioning school principal. He described the rule in Tinker v. Des Moines Independent Community School District,  as "that there is a right to political speech subject to disruption—that the speech not be disruptive". He defined the disruptiveness in general terms as behavior inimical to the educational mission of the school, and in specific terms as a violation of the school's announced policy to enforce and support laws with respect to the control of marijuana (and other laws in general). Starr also cited the cases of Bethel School District v. Fraser,  and Hazelwood v. Kuhlmeier, .

Starr noted that in Tinker there was no written policy; it was an issue of "standardless discretion" being exercised. That case was said to be concerned with school disciplinary actions "casting a pall of orthodoxy to prevent the discussion of ideas". Justice Souter remarked that 'Bong Hits 4 JESUS' "sounds like just a kid's provocative statement to me". Starr responded by saying "the key is to allow the school official to interpret the message as long as that interpretation is reasonable."

Deputy Solicitor-General Edwin Kneedler spoke on behalf of the U.S. government in support of the petitioner. He said: "The First Amendment does not require public school officials to stand aside and permit students who are entrusted to their supervision and care to promote or encourage the illegal use of drugs." He cited the cases of Board of Education v. Earls and Hazelwood v. Kuhlmeier in his favor.

Douglas K. Mertz, of Juneau, Alaska, for the respondent opened, "This is a case about free speech. It is not about drugs." Chief Justice John Roberts responded: "It's a case about money. Your client wants money from the principal personally for her actions in this case." Mertz emphasized that the torch relay was not school-sponsored; that he had not stepped on school property at all before presenting the banner; that "BONG HiTS 4 JESUS" was intended to be—and was regarded as—a purely humorous message; and that the unfurling of the banner did not cause any disruption. Based on these facts, he concludes, his case "does not present the issue of school authority over student expressions on campus or in a school-sponsored activity".

Starr rebutted. He cited Vernonia School District 47J v. Acton and Board of Education v. Earls as cases demonstrative of the Court's strong past stances on matter related to combating the "scourge of drugs". In closing and in summary, he said:

Opinions

Opinion of the Court
Chief Justice Roberts, writing for a majority of five justices, concluded that the school officials did not violate the First Amendment by confiscating the pro-drug banner and suspending the student responsible for it. After reciting the background in Part I of the opinion, in Part II he determined that "school speech" doctrine should apply because Frederick's speech occurred "at a school event"; Part III determined that the speech was "reasonably viewed as promoting illegal drug use"; and Part IV, inquired whether a principal may legally restrict that speech, concluding that she could—under the three existing First Amendment school speech precedents, other Constitutional jurisprudence relating to schools, and a school's "important—indeed, perhaps compelling interest" in deterring drug use by students.

Speech falls under school speech jurisprudence
First, Roberts determined that the Court should analyze Frederick's speech under the comparatively strict doctrine of "school speech"—rejecting "at the outset" Frederick's contention that the case should instead be considered under ordinary free-speech jurisprudence. While conceding that past precedent reflects "some uncertainty at the outer boundaries as to when courts should apply school-speech precedents", Roberts added: "but not on these facts". Roberts reiterated the circumstances, then explained: "Under these circumstances, we agree with the superintendent that Frederick cannot 'stand in the midst of his fellow students, during school hours, at a school-sanctioned activity and claim he is not at school.'"

Principal reasonably interpreted speech

Next, Roberts determined that the principal's conclusion that Frederick's banner "advocated the use of illegal drugs" was reasonable. Acknowledging that the banner's message was "cryptic", nevertheless it was undeniably a "reference to illegal drugs". In reaching this conclusion, Roberts contrasted "the paucity of alternative meanings the banner might bear" against the fact that the two immediately available interpretations of the words support this conclusion:

And even if that second interpretation does not support the principal's conclusions that the banner advocated the use of illegal drugs,

Wrapping up this discussion, Roberts rejected the two alternative accounts for Frederick's speech provided in the dissent: first, the dissent noted that Frederick "just wanted to get on television", which it characterized as a "credible and uncontradicted explanation for the message". Roberts rejoined: "But that is a description of Frederick's motive for displaying the banner; it is not an interpretation of what the banner says." Second, the dissent emphasized the importance of political speech and the need to foster "national debate about a serious issue". Roberts rejoined that "not even Frederick argues that the banner conveys any sort of political or religious message"; "this is plainly not a case about political debate over the criminalization of drug use or possession."

First Amendment permits schools to restrict such speech
Finally, Roberts inquired whether a principal may restrict such speech. He concluded that she can.

He began by reviewing the court's school speech jurisprudence:
 First, Roberts recapitulated that student expression may be suppressed only if school officials reasonably conclude that it will "materially and substantially disrupt the work and discipline of the school"—observing however that this doctrine came from a case (Tinker v. Des Moines Independent Community School Dist.) in which the students were engaging in "political speech" in "a silent, passive expression of opinion, unaccompanied by any disorder or disturbance" (wearing armbands, to express "disapproval of the Vietnam hostilities and their advocacy of a truce, to make their views known, and, by their example, to influence others to adopt them". Id., at 514), and in which "[t]he only interest the Court discerned underlying the school's actions was the "mere desire to avoid the discomfort and unpleasantness that always accompany an unpopular viewpoint", or "an urgent wish to avoid the controversy which might result from the expression". Roberts commented on this opinion with a quote from Virginia v. Black—that political speech is "at the core of what the First Amendment is designed to protect". 538 U.S. 343, 365 (2003).
 Second, Roberts cited Bethel School Dist. No. 403 v. Fraser. The jurisprudence of Fraser is controversial, but Roberts declined to apply or resolve the disputed holding of that case ("We need not resolve this debate to decide this case"); instead, he explained that "[f]or present purposes, it is enough to distill from Fraser two basic principles":
that "the constitutional rights of students in public school are not automatically coextensive with the rights of adults in other settings" ("in light of the special characteristics of the school environment").
that the "substantial disruption" analysis prescribed by Tinker "is not absolute" (i.e., it is flexible/optional).
 Third, Roberts cited the most recent student speech case, Hazelwood School Dist. v. Kuhlmeier. In that case, the Court permitted a school to "exercise editorial control over the style and content of student speech in school-sponsored expressive activities" (declining to publish articles in the school paper that "the public might reasonably perceive to bear the imprimatur of the school") "so long as their actions are reasonably related to legitimate pedagogical concerns". Roberts found that this case, though factually distinct, was "nevertheless instructive because it confirms both principles cited above".

Roberts then cited cases that cited Tinker in the course of interpreting the qualified status that other Constitutional rights acquire in schools—Vernonia School Dist. 47J v. Acton, New Jersey v. T. L. O., Board of Ed. of Independent School Dist. No. 92 of Pottawatomie Cty. v. Earls. In light of these concerns, Roberts devoted his lengthiest analysis to the government's "important — indeed, perhaps compelling interest" in deterring drug use by students. To this point, the opinion cited statistics illustrating the problems of youth drug abuse. It further noted that part of a school's educational mission is "to educate students about the dangers of illegal drugs and to discourage their use". The District Court also noted "peer pressure is perhaps 'the single most important factor leading school children to take drugs.'" The Court's interpretation of Frederick's banner deemed the banner as a type of peer pressure. Based on these concerns, the opinion concluded that the principal's actions were motivated by a "serious and palpable" danger of drug abuse quite different from the amorphous fears of anti-war sentiment at play in Tinker.

In Tinker, the school principal had punished students for wearing black anti-war armbands based on his "undifferentiated fear or apprehension of disturbance" or "mere desire to avoid ... discomfort and unpleasantness". Here, however, the concern about student drug abuse "extends well beyond an abstract desire to avoid controversy". Principal Morse's failure to act against the banner "would send a powerful message to the students in her charge, including Frederick, about how serious the school was about the dangers of illegal drug use". The First Amendment, concluded the opinion, "does not require schools to tolerate at school events student expression that contributes to those dangers".

Concurrences
Justice Clarence Thomas wrote a concurrence that argued that students in public schools do not have a right to free speech and that Tinker should be overturned. Thomas wrote, "In my view, the history of public education suggests that the First Amendment, as originally understood, does not protect student speech in public schools." He praised Hugo Black's dissenting opinion on Tinker and called it "prophetic". Thomas cited the doctrine of in loco parentis, meaning "in place of the parent", in his opinion. He traced the history of public education in America back to its colonial roots. According to Thomas, because originally public schools were intended to substitute for private tutors, public schools could discipline students as they liked and had a far stronger hand in what happened in the classroom. "In short", he continues, "in the earliest public schools, teachers taught, and students listened. Teachers commanded, and students obeyed." He opined that because parents entrusted the care of their children to teachers, teachers have a right to act in the place of parents during school hours. Therefore, teachers should be able to discipline students if necessary. Thomas lambasted Tinker for "usurping [the local school district as a] traditional authority for the judiciary". Thomas believed that Frederick was neither speaking gibberish nor openly advocating drug use, but granting such an impertinence constitutional protection "would ... be to 'surrender control of the American public school system to public school students.'"

Justice Samuel Alito, joined by Justice Anthony Kennedy, wrote a concurrence indicating that he agreed with the majority opinion to the extent that:

Alito agreed that Morse did not violate Frederick's First Amendment rights and emphasized in his concurrence that the holding only applies to students who advocate illegal drug use. He opposed the "educational mission" and in loco parentis analysis in favor of a "special characteristic" of schools that he identifies to be ensuring the physical safety of the students. Alito concluded that an exception must be made to the First Amendment free speech guarantee to protect the students; since according to Alito, advocating illegal drugs possibly leads to violence. But Alito insisted that this small reduction of what is protected by the First Amendment is "at the far reaches of what the First Amendment permits".

Concurrence in part and dissent in part
Justice Stephen Breyer concurred in the judgment in part and dissented in part, arguing that the Court should not have directly answered the First Amendment question in the case, but rather decided it based on qualified immunity. Qualified immunity is an affirmative defense that requires courts to enter judgment in favor of a government employee accused of violating individual rights unless the employee's conduct violates "clearly established statutory or constitutional rights of which a reasonable person would have known". Because it was not clear whether the school principal's actions in taking down the banner violated the First Amendment, Breyer would have simply issued a narrow decision indicating that she was shielded by qualified immunity and gone no further.

Dissent
Justice John Paul Stevens, in a dissent joined by Justice Souter and Justice Ginsburg, argued that "the Court does serious violence to the First Amendment in upholding—indeed, lauding—a school's decision to punish Frederick for expressing a view with which it disagreed." Stevens wrote:

Stevens criticized the majority decision as one that "trivializes the two cardinal principles upon which Tinker rests", because it "upholds a punishment meted out on the basis of a listener's disagreement with her understanding (or, more likely, misunderstanding) of the speaker's viewpoint". Moreover, he noted, "Encouraging drug use might well increase the likelihood that a listener will try an illegal drug, but that hardly justifies censorship". "[C]arving out pro-drug speech for uniquely harsh treatment finds no support in our case law and is inimical to the values protected by the First Amendment."

Stevens also took issue with the majority's interpretation of the banner as being a serious incitement to drug use:

Stevens argued that it would be "profoundly unwise to create special rules for speech about drug and alcohol use", pointing to the historical examples of both opposition to the Vietnam War and resistance to Prohibition in the 1920s. Pointing to the current debate over medical marijuana, Stevens concluded, "Surely our national experience with alcohol should make us wary of dampening speech suggesting—however inarticulately—that it would be better to tax and regulate marijuana than to persevere in a futile effort to ban its use entirely."

Academic commentary

Melinda Cupps Dickler 
Melinda Cupps Dickler, in her article "The Morse Quartet: Student Speech and the First Amendment" in the Loyola Law Review, provided a survey of commentary that followed in the immediate aftermath of the case: Some commentators have suggested that Morse both demonstrated a division among the Justices on student speech rights and continued Fraser's and Kuhlmeier's erosion of students' First Amendment rights. She regards this suggestion as "not surprising" given the outcome of the decision, the plain language of the holding, and the dissenting Justices' charge that the opinion did "serious violence to the First Amendment". She adds that other commentators have asserted that while Morse did not dramatically change the law regarding student speech, it failed to answer any of the questions left by the Tinker trilogy. She notes that these questions—what First Amendment protection is owed to student speech, and how courts should analyze its censorship—are currently significant as schools struggle with the issues of discriminatory student speech or hate speech, and student speech threatening violence. Further, "such questions are always paramount because schools are the training grounds for our nation's citizens and future leaders."

Kenneth Starr
Kenneth Starr, former Dean at Pepperdine University School of Law, and who argued for Morse before the Supreme Court, introduced a symposium about the case noting that Chief Justice Roberts "sought to keep the decision quite narrow", limiting the case "to the issue of public school administrators' ability to keep the educational process free from messages about illegal drugs" and drawing from the Court's existing student speech jurisprudence that "permitted school administrators broad discretion to keep out of the educational environment antisocial messages celebrating drug use".

Erwin Chemerinsky
Leading constitutional law scholar Erwin Chemerinsky participated in the same symposium, exploring how this decision would be understood and applied by school officials, school boards, and lower court judges. He suggested that the opinion was misguided and—from a First Amendment perspective—highly undesirable, arguing that the decision cannot be justified under existing First Amendment principles, that it could be seen as authorizing punishment of students for speech that is deemed distasteful or offensive, even just juvenile. However, he noted Justice Alito's concurring opinion, which suggests that the majority opinion might be exceedingly narrow and based on a very unusual factual context; Chemerinsky noted that if Justice Alito's opinion is seen as defining the scope of the holding, then the case establishes only the power of schools to punish speech encouraging illegal drug use rather than giving school officials great discretion to punish student speech. Thus, despite the fact that Morse v. Frederick is consistent with decisions from the Supreme Court and lower federal courts over the last two decades, his hope is that Chief Justice Roberts's majority opinion will be read through the prism of Justice Alito's concurring opinion, thereby having little effect on the already very limited First Amendment rights of students.

Subsequent judicial interpretation
Melinda Cupps Dickler noted that "The few courts that have discussed Morse have disagreed about the breadth of its holding," supporting this claim with the following citations:

Compare Lowery v. Euverard, 497 F.3d 584, 602 (6th Cir. 2007) (Gilman, J., concurring) (noting that Morse's holding is narrow), and Layshock v. Hermitage Sch. Dist., 496 F. Supp. 2d 587, 596-97 (W.D. Pa. 2007) (iterating that Morse did not alter the Tinker framework), with Boim v. Fulton County Sch. Dist., 494 F.3d 978, 9984 (11th Cir. 2007) (holding that Morse's holding is broad). The Layshock court stated that Morse did not change the basic framework established by the Tinker trilogy, which it described as a scheme in which Fraser and Kuhlmeier are exceptions to Tinker's general rule. Layshock, 496 F. Supp. 2d at 596. Significantly, however, the court cited to both Morse and Tinker as requiring courts to defer to school officials' decisions about punishing student speech. Id. at 597. On the other hand, the court also accepted Justice Alito's concurring argument in Morse when it held that Morse does not permit school officials to regulate student speech merely on the basis that it is incompatible with the schools' educational missions. Id. at 599.

By contrast, the Eleventh Circuit extended Morse's rationale about illegal drugs to the context of student speech that is "construed as a threat of school violence". Boim, 494 F.3d at 984 (upholding the suspension of a high school student for a story labeled as a "dream" in which she described shooting her math teacher). Moreover, the court concluded that Morse supports the idea that student speech can be regulated where "[in] a school administrator's professional observation ... certain expressions [of student speech] have led to, and therefore could lead to, an unhealthy and potentially unsafe learning environment". Id. at 983 (quoting Scott v. Sch. Bd., 324 F.3d 1246, 1247 (11th Cir. 2003)). Some commentators predict that courts will extend Morse to further restrict protection for student speech. See, e.g., Hilden, supra note 12 (discussing Wisniewski v. Bd. of Educ. of Weedsport Cent. Sch. Dist., 494 F.3d 34 (2d Cir. 2007)); see also infra text accompanying note 17 (providing further discussion of Wisniewski, in which the Second Circuit cited to Morse, but applied Tinker).

Groups involved
The American Civil Liberties Union directly participated in this case on the side of Joseph Frederick. The Center for Individual Rights, National Coalition Against Censorship, and other groups that advocate First Amendment protection filed amici curiae in support of Frederick. Students for Sensible Drug Policy also noted that banning drug-related speech would undermine their ability to have chapters in public schools. The American Center for Law and Justice, and Rutherford Institute, and several other Christian right groups also filed briefs on the side of Frederick, reasoning that if schools could ban "offensive" speech they would also be able to prohibit religious speech with which administrators disagree. On this point, the Christian right groups prevailed, as the Supreme Court explicitly declined to hold that school boards could discipline "offensive" speech, noting that "much political and religious speech might be perceived as offensive to some" and the concern is "not that Frederick's speech was offensive, but that it was reasonably viewed as promoting illegal drug use".

The National School Boards Association supported Morse and the Juneau school district, arguing that schools should be able to regulate controversial speech. U.S. Solicitor General Paul Clement filed an amicus brief in support of the school district's decision to prohibit controversial speech.

On March 19, 2007, Students for Sensible Drug Policy organized a free speech rally at the Supreme Court during oral arguments. The Drug Policy Alliance and the National Youth Rights Association assisted with the rally which brought dozens of students from across the country to the court steps.

Aftermath
The U.S. Supreme Court decision did not resolve all of the issues in the case. Frederick claimed his speech rights under the Constitution of Alaska were violated, and the issue was argued in front of the Alaska Court of Appeals in September 2008. However, the school district agreed to settle out of court before the judges reached a decision. In November 2008, the district paid Frederick $45,000 to settle all remaining claims and agreed to hire a neutral constitutional law expert to lead a forum on student speech at Juneau-Douglas High School by the end of the school year. Frederick later said that while he was proud of himself for standing up for his rights, he regretted "the bad precedent set by the ruling".

The original "BONG HiTS 4 JESUS" banner hung in the First Amendment gallery of the now-defunct Newseum in Washington, D.C.

See also
 Cannabis in the United States
 Censorship of student media in the United States
 Legal history of cannabis in the United States
 List of United States Supreme Court cases, volume 551

Explanatory notes

References

Further reading

External links
 
 Bong Hits 4 Jesus Toke Two - The Washington Post Opinion, Emil Steiner
 [ Supreme Court Oral Argument Transcript]
 Video of March 19 free speech demonstration at the U.S. Supreme Court
 Analysis of the Supreme Court ruling by Andy Carvin
 Opinion of the Ninth Circuit Court of Appeals
 Yale Law Journal commentary
 MSNBC article on the incident
 Starr Goes From Cigars to Bongs - Wall Street Journal - Washington Wire blog article
 9th Circuit: 'Bong Hits 4 Jesus' Banner Was Free Speech - Law.com case overview (archived)
 'Bong Hits' Banner Gives Supreme Court Chance to Clear the Air on Student Speech - Law.com certiorari candidate (archived)
 Bong Hits 4 Jesus Toke Three - The Washington Post Opinion, Emil Steiner
 Student Press Law Center on the Appeals Court decision
 San Francisco Gate on the appeal
 List of briefs filed in the case, including several amicus briefs
 Analysis of the semantics of Bong hits 4 Jesus
 Video of Bong Hits 4 Jesus song about the case

2007 in United States case law
American Civil Liberties Union litigation
History of drug control in the United States
Juneau, Alaska
Student rights case law in the United States
United States Free Speech Clause case law
United States Supreme Court cases
United States Supreme Court cases of the Roberts Court